Astana, previously known as Akmolinsk, Tselinograd, Akmola, and most recently Nur-Sultan, is the capital city of Kazakhstan.

The city lies on the banks of the Ishim River in the north-central part of Kazakhstan, within the Akmola Region, though administered as a city with special status separately from the rest of the region. A 2020 official estimate reported a population of 1,136,008 within the city limits, making it the second-largest city in the country, after Almaty, which had been the capital until 1997. The city became the capital of Kazakhstan in 1997; since then it has grown and developed economically into one of the most modern cities in Central Asia. In 2021, the government selected Astana as one of the 10 priority destinations for tourist development.

Modern Astana is a planned city, following the process of other planned capitals. After it became the capital of Kazakhstan, the city dramatically changed its shape. The city's master-plan was designed by Japanese architect Kisho Kurokawa. As the seat of the government of Kazakhstan, Astana is the site of the Parliament House, Supreme Court, Ak Orda Presidential Palace and numerous government departments and agencies. It is home to a range of futuristic buildings, including many skyscrapers.

Names 
Akmola settlement was founded in 1830, possibly named after a local landmark—Ақ мола literally means white grave in Kazakh—although this theory is not universally accepted. In 1832, it was granted town status and renamed Akmolinsk. In 1961 under Soviet government, it was renamed Tselinograd, Russian for "virgin lands city". In 1991 following Kazakhstan's independence, the name was changed to Akmola.

In December 1997, the city replaced Almaty as the capital of Kazakhstan, and in May 1998, it was renamed Astana, which means "capital city" in Kazakh. In March 2019, the capital was renamed to Nur-Sultan in honor of the long-ruling President Nursultan Nazarbayev, shortly after his resignation. In September 2022, President Kassym-Jomart Tokayev signed a constitutional amendment to revert to the name Astana. , it holds the Guinness World Record for the capital city with the most name changes in modern times.

History

Middle Ages (8th to 18th centuries)
Many centuries ago, the Bozok settlement was located on the territory of modern Astana. It was a military fortress of the Steppe section of the Great Silk Road. The etymology of the Turkic word "Boz" carries several meanings such as ‘untouched earth’, ‘virgin soil’ and ‘feather grass’. It was a large settlement of the 12-14th centuries. At present, Astana is expanding to the territory of ancient Bozok.

Early years (1830–1918) 
The settlement of Akmoly was established on the Ishim River in 1830 as the seat of an okrug. In 1832, the settlement was granted town status and named Akmolinsk. The fairly advantageous position of the town was clear as early as 1863. It describes how picket roads and lines connected this geographic center to Kargaly in the East, Aktau fort in the South and through Atbasar to Kokshetau in the West. In 1838, at the height of the great national and liberation movement headed by Kenesary Khan, Akmolinsk fortress was burned. After the repression of the liberation movement, the fortress was rebuilt. On 16 July 1863, Akmolinsk was officially declared an uyezd town. In 1869, Akmolinsk external district and department were cancelled, and Akmolinsk became the center of the newly established Akmolinsk Oblast. In 1879, Major General Dubelt proposed to build a railway between Tyumen and Akmolinsk to the Ministry of Communications of Russia.  In the course of the first 30 years of its existence, the population of Akmola numbered a trifle more than 2,000 people. However, over the next 30 years the city's population increased by three times according to volosts and settlements of the Akmolinsk Oblast. In 1893, Akmolinsk was an uyezd with a 6,428 strong population, 3 churches, 5 schools and colleges and 3 factories.

Soviet era (1918–1991) 
During World War II, Akmolinsk served as a route for the transport of engineering tools and equipment from evacuated plants in the Ukrainian SSR, Byelorussian SSR, and Russian SFSR located in the oblasts of the Kazakh SSR. Local industries were appointed to respond to war needs, assisting the country to provide the battle and home fronts with all materials needed. In the post-war years, Akmolinsk became a beacon of economic revival in the west of the Soviet Union ruined by the war. Additionally, many Russian-Germans were resettled here after being deported under Joseph Stalin's rule.

In 1954, Northern Kazakh SSR oblasts became a territory of the Virgin Lands Campaign, in order to turn the region into a second grain producer for the Soviet Union. In December 1960, Central Committee made a resolution to create the Tselinniy Krai, which comprised five regions of the Northern Kazakh SSR oblasts. Akmolinsk Oblast was ceased to exist as a separate administrative entity. Its districts were directly subordinated to the new krai administration, and Akmolinsk became the krai capital, as well as the administrative seat of the new Virgin Lands economic region. On 14 March 1961, Khrushchev suggested the city should have a name corresponding to its role in the Virgin Lands Campaign. On 20 March 1961, the Supreme Soviet of the Kazakh SSR renamed Akmolinsk Tselinograd. On 24 April 1961, the region was reconstituted as Tselinograd Oblast. In the 1960s, Tselinograd was completely transformed. In 1963, work on the first three new high-rise housing districts began. In addition, the city received a number of new monumental public buildings, including the Virgin Lands Palace, a Palace of Youth, a House of Soviets, a new airport, and several sports venues. In 1971, the Tselinniy Krai was abolished and Tselinograd became the centre of the oblast.

Contemporary era (1991–present) 
After the dissolution of the Soviet Union and the consequent independence of Kazakhstan, the city's original name was restored in the modified form Akmola. On 6 July 1994, the Supreme Council of Kazakhstan adopted the decree "On the transfer of the capital of Kazakhstan". After the capital of Kazakhstan was moved to Akmola on 10 December 1997, the city was consequently renamed Astana in 1998. On 10 June 1998, Astana was presented as the capital internationally. Due to several determined advantages, Astana was chosen as the capital: large urban areas, favorable geographical position, proximity to the major economic centers of the region, considerable demographic capacity, good transportation facilities, and a relatively favorable climate. On 16 July 1999, Astana was awarded the medal and title of the City of Peace by UNESCO.

In March 2019, the Kazakhstani government renamed the city Nur-Sultan to honour the country's outgoing long-term authoritarian president, Nursultan Nazarbayev. In September 2022, after a number of controversies and unrest resulting in Nazarbayev's resignation from the Security Council of Kazakhstan, the name of the capital was changed back to Astana.

Geography

Astana is almost  from the country's largest city and former capital, Almaty. The nearest big cities are Karaganda and Omsk in Russia.

Topography
Astana is located in central Kazakhstan on the Ishim River in a very flat, semi-arid steppe region which covers most of the country's territory. It is at 51° 10' north latitude and 71° 26' east longitude. The city encompasses . Astana is in a spacious steppe landscape, in the transitional area between the north of Kazakhstan and the extremely thinly settled national centre, because of the Ishim River. The older boroughs lie north of the river, whilst the new boroughs are located south of the Ishim.

Time 
The time offset from the UTC used by Astana is 6 hours ahead of UTC, or UTC+6:00. This is also used by most of Kazakhstan and Almaty.

Climate
Astana is the second-coldest national capital in the world after Ulaanbaatar, Mongolia, a position formerly held by Canada's capital, Ottawa, until Astana attained capital city status in 1997. Astana has an extreme continental climate with warm summers (featuring occasional brief rain showers) and long, very cold, dry winters. Summer temperatures occasionally reach  while  is not unusual between mid-December and early March. Typically, the city's river is frozen over between the second week of November and the beginning of April. Astana has a well-deserved reputation among Kazakhs for its frequent high winds, the effects of which are felt particularly strongly on the fast-developing but relatively exposed Left Bank area of the city.

Overall, Astana has a humid continental climate (Köppen climate classification Dfb).

Demographics

Population 
As of January 2020, the population of Astana is 1,136,008; over double the 2002 population of 493,000.

As of 2018, ethnic Kazakhs made up 80.6% of the city population, representing a significant increase from only 17% at the time of the country's independence.

Ethnic groups (2020):
 Kazakh: 79.1%
Russian: 12.85%
Ukrainian: 1.32%
Tatar: 1.08%
Uzbek: 0.96%
 Others: 4.65%

In 1989, Tselinograd had a population of 281,000. The ethnic mix was about 17.7% Kazakh, 54.1% Russian and 28.2% other ethnic groups.

By 2007, Astana's population had more than doubled since becoming the capital, to over 600,000, and it topped 1 million in 2017. Migrant workers—legal and illegal—have been attracted from across Kazakhstan and neighbouring states such as Uzbekistan and Kyrgyzstan, and Astana is a magnet for young professionals seeking to build a career.

Religion 

Islam is the predominant religion of the city. Other religions practiced are Christianity (primarily Russian Orthodoxy, Roman Catholicism, and Protestantism), Judaism, and Buddhism.

The Palace of Peace and Reconciliation was specially constructed in 2006 to host the Congress of Leaders of World and Traditional Religions. It contains accommodations for different religions: Judaism, Islam, Christianity, Buddhism, Hinduism, Taoism and other faiths.

Central Asia's largest mosque is found in Astana.

Metropolitan area
The metropolitan area centered upon Astana includes the Arshaly, Shortandy, Tselinograd and (partially) Akkol districts of Akmola Region. The area contains 1.2 million people.

Economy

Astana's economy is based on trade, industrial production, transport, communication and construction. The city's industrial production is mainly focused on producing building materials, foodstuff and mechanical engineering.

Astana is the leader in the CIS region on Global Financial Centers Index rank in 2022.

The Astana International Financial Center (AIFC) opened in July 2018 to become a hub for financial services in Central Asia.

Astana is the headquarters of state-owned corporations such as Samruk-Kazyna, Kazakhstan Temir Zholy, KazMunayGas, KazTransOil, Kazatomprom, KEGOC, Kazpost and Kazakhtelecom.

The shift of the capital has given it a powerful boost to Astana's economic development. The city's high economic growth rate has attracted numerous investors. In the 16 years since Astana became the capital, the volume of investments has increased by almost 30 times, the gross regional product has increased by 90 times, and industrial output has increased by 11 times. The city's Gross Regional Product makes up about 8.5 per cent of the republic's Gross domestic product.

The Astana – New City special economic zone was established in 2001 to help develop industry and increase the attractiveness of the city to investors. The SEZ plans to commission five projects worth 20 billion KZT (around $108 million) in the Industrial Park No. 1 in 2015. The projects include construction of a plant for production of diesel engines, a fast food complex, temporary storage warehouses and a business center, a furniture factory, and production of military and civil engineering machinery. The new Astana International Financial Centre opened in July 2018.

Astana's administration is promoting the development of small and medium-sized businesses through the cooperation of the Sovereign Welfare Fund Samruk-Kazyna and National Economic Chamber. Support is provided by a special programme of crediting. As a result, the number of small and medium-sized businesses increased by 13.7% to over 96,000 compared to the previous year as of 1 July 2015. In addition, the number of people employed in small and medium-sized business increased by 17.8% to over 234,000 people as of 1 April 2015.

Astana was included in the list of top 21 intelligent communities of the world, according to the report released by the Intelligent Community Forum in October 2016. The rating list includes the cities, regions and communities which use digital instruments for the construction of local economy and society.

In 2018, Astana attracted more than three trillion tenge (US$7.91 billion) in foreign direct investment, a record amount for the city. The growth was achieved due to a large number of construction projects.

Tourism becomes one of the factors that drive economic growth in the city. Astana is among the top ten most attractive tourist cities in the Commonwealth of Independent States (CIS).

Diplomacy platform 
Astana has become a platform for high-profile diplomatic talks and summits on critical global issues. Astana has hosted multiple rounds of talks between the Syrian Arab Republic government led by Bashar al-Assad and Syrian opposition. The 12th Ministerial Conference of the World Trade Organization (WTO) was originally scheduled to take place in June 2020 in then Nur-Sultan, Kazakhstan, but was postponed due to the COVID-19 pandemic. In May 2020, WTO members discussed Kazakhstan's offer to reschedule the conference to June 2021 but postponed taking a decision due to the ongoing pandemic. In April 2021, members agreed that MC12 would take place in Geneva from 30 November to 3 December. Since 2003, Astana has hosted the Congress on World and Traditional Religions, which is a diverse gathering of religious leaders to discuss religious harmony and ending terrorism and extremism.

Cityscape

Astana is subdivided into four districts. Almaty District was created on 6 May 1998 by presidential decree. The district has five villages. Yesil District, which is also called left bank of the city, was created on 5 August 2008 by presidential decree. Saryarka District was created on 6 May 1998 by presidential decree. Baykonyr District was created on 16 March 2018 by presidential decree.

In April 1998, the Government of Kazakhstan asked architects and urban planners of international renown to participate in a design competition for the new capital. On 6 October 1998, Japanese architect Kisho Kurokawa was awarded the First Prize. Kurokawa's proposal aimed to preserve and redevelop the existing city, and create a new city at the south and the east sides of the Ishim River, enabling the Symbiosis of the History and the Future.

North of the railway line, which crosses Astana in an east–west direction, are industrial and poorer residential areas. Between the railway line and the Ishim river is the city centre, where at present intense building activity is occurring. To the west and east are more elevated residential areas with parks and the new area of government administration to the south of the Ishim River. Here many large building projects are under way; for example, the construction of a diplomatic quarter, and government buildings. By 2030, these quarters are to be completed. Astana's chief planner, Vladimir Laptev, wants to build a Berlin in a Eurasian style. He has stated that a purely administrative capital such as Canberra is not one of his goals.

Sport

The city has a variety of sports teams. The major association football team is the FC Astana of the Kazakhstan Premier League. Founded in 2009, the FC Astana won six league titles, three Kazakh Cups and five Kazakh Super Cups. Their home stadium is the Astana Arena, which also serves as a home for the Kazakhstan national football team and the FC Bayterek. The FC Bayterek is a member of the Kazakhstan First Division. They were founded in 2012, to develop youth football. The FC Astana-1964 is based in the Kazhymukan Munaitpasov Stadium and plays in the Astana Municipal Football League. The club's most successful years were 2000s, when they won 3 league titles.

Astana is home to several professional ice hockey teams. The Barys Astana, a founding member of the Kontinental Hockey League in 2008 and based in the Barys Arena. The Nomad Astana and HC Astana play in the Kazakhstan Hockey Championship. The Snezhnye Barsy of the Junior Hockey League is a junior team of the Barys Astana. Astana annually hosts the President of the Republic of Kazakhstan's Cup ice hockey tournament.

The Astana Pro Team, founded in 2007, participates in the UCI World Tour. The team is one of the most successful road cycling teams of recent years, winning several grand tours. The BC Astana of the VTB United League and the Kazakhstan Basketball League is the only professional basketball team in Astana. It is the most successful basketball team in Kazakhstan with three Kazakhstan Basketball League titles and four Kazakhstan Basketball Cups. Its home arena is the Saryarka Velodrome, which is mainly used for track cycling events. The Saryarka Velodrome hosted the UCI Track Cycling World Cup stage in 2011. The Astana Presidential Sports Club was founded in 2012, to combine the main sports teams in Astana. The organization is supported by Sovereign Wealth Fund Samruk-Kazyna. The 2011 Asian Winter Games were partly held in the capital. The Alau Ice Palace, hosted the 2015 World Sprint Speed Skating Championships. The President's Cup tennis tournament is annually held at the Daulet National Tennis Centre.

The martial art palace was opened on 6 July 2019. Sports facilities for five thousand spectators can take part in international competitions in boxing, wrestling, judo, weightlifting, and other Olympic and non-Olympic disciplines. The palace has a 25-meter pool, fitness and wrestling rooms, a football field, as well as a comfortable hotel. The object will be made available to the pupils of the sports school.

Education

Astana has many universities and junior colleges.  academic year, Astana had a total enrollment of 53,561 students in its 14 higher educational institutions, a 10% increase from the prior year. The L.N.Gumilyov Eurasian National University is the biggest university in Astana with 16,558 students and 1,678 academic staff. It was founded as the result of merging the Akmola Civil Engineering Institute with the Akmola Pedagogical Institute on 23 May 1996. The oldest university in Astana is the S. Seifullin Kazakh Agro Technical University founded in 1957. Nazarbayev University is an autonomous research university founded in 2010 in partnership with some of the world's top universities. The Kazakh University of Economics, Finance and International Trade is an economic institution in Astana. The Kazakh Humanities and Law Institute is a law university founded by initiative of Ministry of Justice in 1994. The Astana Medical University was the only medical school in Astana until the opening of the School of Medecine at Nazarbayev University in 2014. The Kazakh National University of Arts is the premier music school and has provided Astana with highly qualified professional specialists in the field of Arts.

Astana schools enrolls about 103,000 students across 83 schools, including 71 state schools and 12 private schools. The Miras International School, established 1999, was the first private high school established in Astana. The Haileybury Astana school was established in 2011, as a branch of the Haileybury and Imperial Service College, an independent school in The United Kingdom. The Astana Kazakh-Turkish High Schools are run by the International KATEV foundation. There are Kazakh-Turkish High Boarding Schools for gifted boys and girls, separately and the Nurorda International School. Astana hosts two Nazarbayev Intellectual Schools (NIS), including the School of Physics and Mathematics and International Baccalaureate world school. The QSI International School of Astana is an international school that provides an American curriculum to its students. The school is a branch of the Quality Schools International that started in the Middle East.

Transportation

City transport 

The city transport in Astana consists of buses and taxis. Over 720,000 people use public transport daily. There are over 60 bus lines served by more than 1000 vehicles, with over 3000 people working in the public transport sector. Just like buses, share taxis have their own predefined routes and work on a shared basis. There are three share taxi routes in total.

Trolleybus routes were opened in 1983. There were originally 3 routes, however, by 2006, only one route was left. In 2008, the only trolleybus fleet by the special state commission was declared unprofitable due to debts to the energy supply company and as a result, it was completely closed.

In 2011, the Akimat of Astana established a company to implement a series of changes and programmes in the metropolis known as the "New transport system of Astana". As part of these programmes, bus rapid transit (BRT) lines were opened. That same year, the construction of a light rail (LRT) was to begin. It was planned that the first stage of construction of a 16.4-kilometer line, which would've included nine stations, was planned to be completed by 1 December 2013. However, as of May 2020, construction has not started. In November 2013, President Nursultan Nazarbayev condemned the construction of LRT because of the high cost. In exchange, there was a promise to launch high-speed buses. Despite the controversy, the construction of the LRT began in 2017 with the flyovers along to which the trains will pass. The opening is planned for the end of 2020.

The bicycle-sharing program AstanaBike has been operating in Astana since 2014. In 2017, the system consisted of 40 stations with 1000 bicycles. The registration in the system for a season costs 5000 tenge ($28), plus a deposit for an RFID card ($5.50), the first half-hour of bike rental is free, the next hour is 100 tenge ($0.55). After more than 4 hours, the rent costs 1000 tenge.

Air 
It is the second-busiest airport in Kazakhstan, with 2,960,181 passengers passing through it in 2014. The airport hosts 13 airlines operating regular passenger flights inside the country and internationally. Air Astana maintains its second-largest hub at the airport.

Railway and roads 

Astana is located in the centre of the country, serving as a well-positioned transport node for rail and automotive networks.

Astana railway station is the city's main railway station and serves approximately 7,000 people each day. A new railway station, Nurly Zhol was built during the Expo 2017 event with a customer capacity of 12,000. Tulpar Talgo is a daily express train to Almaty. Short-term plans include the construction of a new railway station in the industrial district; in the vicinity of CHPP-3 a new terminal will be erected for freight cars.

M-36 Chelyabinsk-Almaty and A-343 Astana-Petropavlovsk highways are routed through the city. The strategic geographical positioning of Astana allows the city to serve as a transport and reload centre for cargoes formed at adjacent stations in the area.

River transport 
Since 2008, navigation on the Esil River has been organized within the city. The Akimat of the city in the framework of the implementation of the "Shipping Esil" program created a specialized enterprise GKKP "Esil-Astana".

Expo 2017
On 1 July 2010, at the 153rd General Assembly of Bureau International des Expositions held in Paris, representatives from then-Astana presented the city's bid to host the Specialised Expo 2017. The Kazakh concept for this exhibition relates to the impact of energy on society in the modern world. The theme of the Astana Expo was "Future Energy".

Expo 2017 opened to much fanfare on 10 June 2017, with heads of state from 17 nations in attendance. It is the first world's fair to be held in Central Asia and its central pavilion, Nur Alem, is the largest spherical building in the world. The two-millionth visitor was registered on 7 August. More than 4 million people attended the event.

Sightseeing

Akorda is the residence of the President of the Republic of Kazakhstan
Astana Grand Mosque – the largest mosque in Central Asia, completed in 2022
Baiterek is the main attraction and symbol of Astana
"Ethnoaul National Cultural Complex" – a unique cultural, tourist and image project for Expo 2017.Ethnoaul is a real opportunity to travel to the past and feel like a real nomad, to feel the atmosphere of centuries past. The national-cultural complex will acquaint visitors with the rich history, culture, art and traditions of the Kazakh people, where anyone who is interested will be transferred to the ethno-cultural environment of the nomadic civilization and fully enjoy the daily and festive life of the aul
 is a landmark architectural structure, erected in honour of the anniversary of independence of Kazakhstan on the idea of Nursultan Nazarbayev
Independence Palace – a building designed for diplomatic and other events of international level; the building also has a large-scale layout plan of Astana with existing and future facilities
"Jastar" – the Palace of creativity of schoolchildren and youth
Kazakh Eli – ("The Country of Kazakhs") – a monument on Independence Square. The 91-meter stele is crowned with the Samruk bird (Samұryқ, Simurg) – the king of all birds, the keeper of the peoples. The mythological image of Samruk also includes the second important monument of Kazakhstan – "Baiterek", in the translation "Tree of Life", under which the king of birds sits and spreads seeds on the ground from the flapping of wings
"Kazakhstan" – Central Concert Hall
Khan Shatyr is the largest shopping and entertainment center (considered the largest tent in the world). Architect Norman Foster
 Kazakhstan Pavilion of Expo 2017
Kazakhstan Pavilion and Science Museum "Nur Alem" is the tallest building with a spherical shape, 30 meters in diameter, than the Ericsson-Glob Arena in Stockholm
National Space Center Future Energy Museum "Nur Alem" EXPO 2017 – the spherical building "Nur Alem" (Kaz. Shining World). Its height is 100 meters and its diameter is 80 meters
Nurjol Boulevard (formerly Water-Green Boulevard) is a recreational pedestrian zone with an Alley of Singing Fountains
Palace of Peace and Reconciliation is the Congress Hall, designed for summits and congresses of representatives of traditional Kazakhstan and world religions. Architect Norman Foster
Shabyt Palace – Kazakh National University of Arts

Theaters, concert halls, and museums
There are 27 libraries in Astana, whose services in 2011 were used by 153 people for every thousand residents, 8 state museums, which were visited by 415,500 people in 2011 and which conducted 68,514 excursions, 10 recreation parks, in 2011 1492.2 thousand visitors were received and 99 events, 6 state museums and 6 cinemas were held.
The Central Concert Hall Kazakhstan is a unique complex of the young capital designed for events of various levels: concerts of world and domestic stars, celebrations and official meetings, exhibitions, conferences, presentations. Architect Manfredi Nicoletti
Astana Circus is an entertaining circus institution in the city of Nur Sultan. One of the three main circuses of Kazakhstan; in the territory of the former USSR, one of the newest circuses and one of two unique circus buildings in the form of a "flying saucer" (along with the Kazan circus)
The National Opera and Ballet Theater named after K. Baiseitova is the youngest musical theater in the country, the bearer of the traditions of the Kazakh and world musical culture, comprehending the classical heritage and realizing the spiritual needs of the renewed Kazakhstani society
Astana Opera is a theater founded by the initiative of the first president of Kazakhstan, Nursultan Nazarbayev. The theater building, built in 2013, this Parthenon-styled edifice is one of the cultural centers of the city, staging both classical and original works, is recognized as an architectural monument of national importance
Kazakh Music and Drama Theater named after K. Kuanyshbaev
State Academic Russian Drama Theater named after Maxim Gorky
The National Museum of the Republic of Kazakhstan is the largest museum in Central Asia. The museum was created on behalf of the first president of the Republic of Kazakhstan N.A. *Nazarbayev in the framework of the State program "Cultural Heritage"
Modern Art Museum
Presidential Center of Culture – created on the initiative of the head of state N. Nazarbayev. The uniqueness of the research, cultural and educational complex of the capital is that its structure includes a museum, a library, a concert hall
ALZhIR (Akmola camp of wives of traitors to the motherland) – the largest Soviet women's camp, one of the three "islands" of the "Gulag Archipelago"
Atameken is an ethno-memorial complex of nature, architecture and life on a large-scale map of Kazakhstan
Museum of the First President of the Republic of Kazakhstan
Memorial complex of the Ministry of Internal Affairs (in honor of the heroes of the Great Patriotic War in the capital)
Museum of The Future (Nur-Alem Pavilion) – is more than just a monument of EXPO2017. The museum exhibition is all about the energy of the future. You can learn everything there is to know about renewable, green, and solar-powered energy sources, as well as see a model of the city proposed for 2050

Twin towns – sister cities

Astana is twinned with:

 Amman, Jordan (2005)
 Ankara, Turkey (2001)
 Ashgabat, Turkmenistan (2017)
 Bangkok, Thailand (2004)
 Beijing, China (2006)
 Bishkek, Kyrgyzstan (2011)
 Damascus, Syria
 Gdańsk, Poland (1996)
 Hanoi, Vietnam (2009)
 Islamabad, Pakistan
 Kazan, Russia (2004)
 Kyiv, Ukraine (1998)
 Manila, Philippines
 Moscow, Russia
 Nice, France (2013)
 Oulu, Finland (2013)
 Putrajaya, Malaysia
 Riga, Latvia (1998)
 Saint Petersburg, Russia (1996)
 Seoul, South Korea (2004)
 Tashkent, Uzbekistan
 Tbilisi, Georgia (1996)
 Ufa, Russia (2010)
 Ulaanbaatar, Mongolia (2019)
 Uşak, Turkey
 Vilnius, Lithuania
 Warsaw, Poland (2002)

Friendly cities
Astana also cooperates with:

 Baku, Azerbaijan
 Berlin, Germany
 Bucharest, Romania
 Budapest, Hungary
 Cairo, Egypt
 Chelyabinsk, Russia
 Chișinău, Moldova
 Kurgan, Russia
 Kursk, Russia
 Minsk, Belarus
 Omsk, Russia
 Penza, Russia
 Saratov, Russia
 Sverdlovsk Oblast, Russia
 Tomsk, Russia
 Ürümqi, China

Smart city initiative
The Smart Astana project is an initiative developed by the then-Astana city administration that incorporates technology-driven solutions in various sectors, like hospitals, schools, the ticket booking system and street lighting. These projects run on an interconnected application, the Smart Astana.

Astana's smart city sector includes the annual Astana Innovations Challenge, designed to bring attention to the smart city concept. In addition, the world's first smart sustainable city acceleration hub is set to open in Astana. This hub was planned to integrate from 10 to 15 startup solutions into the infrastructure of Kazakhstan.

See also
 List of people from Astana

Footnotes

References

Further reading

External links

 
 Official website of the BIE
 Expo 2017 Astana-Kazakhstan

 
Akmolinsk Oblast (Russian Empire)
Weather extremes of Earth
Capitals in Asia
Cities and towns in Kazakhstan
Cities in Central Asia
Planned capitals
Populated places established in 1830
Regions of Kazakhstan
1830 establishments in the Russian Empire